Jeffrey Max Jones Jones (born 25 April 1958) is a Mexican politician.

He graduated from Brigham Young University in International Relations in 1982. He is a member of the Church of Jesus Christ of Latter-day Saints and the National Action Party (PAN) of Mexico since 1995. He served in the Chamber of Deputies from 1997 to 2000, representing Chihuahua's First District. He was then elected as a member of the national Senado de la Republica Senate in the year 2000, representing the State of Chihuahua. He served as president of the Border Affairs committee and member of the Agriculture and Agrarian Reform committees. His six-year term expired in 2006 since there is no immediate re-election for senators in Mexico.

Jones served from 2006 to 2009 as Undersecretary of Agribusiness Development with the SAGARPA (Secretaría de Agricultura, Ganaderia, Desarollo Rural, Pesca y Alimentación) and focused on three areas: prospective planning, market development, and finance.

Jones was born and grew up in Colonia Dublán, Nuevo Casas Grandes, in northwestern Chihuahua, Mexico, and lives, by coincidence, in the birth home of George W. Romney, former Governor of Michigan. Jones is bilingual, fluent in English and Spanish. He is the great-great-great grandson of Daniel Webster Jones, an influential early settler in Utah and the Arizona Territory.

References

External links
Profile of Senator Jeffrey Max Jones on the Senate website (in Spanish).
Famous Mormon legislators.
Elizabeth Stuart, "Jeffrey Max Jones: Dreaming of a Better Mexico", March 20, 2011, Deseret News

1958 births
Living people
Brigham Young University alumni
Members of the Senate of the Republic (Mexico)
People from Colonia Dublán
Mexican Latter Day Saints
Mexican people of American descent
National Action Party (Mexico) politicians
Members of the Chamber of Deputies (Mexico)
20th-century Mexican politicians
21st-century Mexican politicians
Politicians from Chihuahua (state)